Electric Park was the name shared by two amusement parks in Kansas City, Missouri, US, that were constructed by Joseph Heim (then president of the Heim Brothers Brewery) and his brothers Michael and Ferdinand Jr. and run by them. The first was built next to the Heim Beer brewery in 1899; the second, a larger one, was built and opened for the public in 1907 and remained in operation until the end of the 1925 season. Animator and entrepreneur Walt Disney cited the second Kansas City Electric Park as his primary inspiration for the design of the first modern theme park, Disneyland.

First park
The Heim brothers built the first Electric Park in land adjacent to the Heim Brothers Brewery (at the time the largest brewery in the world) in East Bottoms. The amusement park was bounded by Montgall, Chestnut, Nicholson, and Rochester Avenues.

Open from 1899 to 1906, the first Electric Park proved to be an immediate success as one of the world's first full-time amusement parks. Featuring a Shoot-the-Chutes ride (called the Mystic Chute), the park also had a beer garden with beer piped directly from the brewery next door. Eventually, the carefully groomed grounds were too small to sustain the park's popularity; at the end of the 1906 season, some of the rides were dismantled and moved to a new location to the south.

Much of the grounds lay neglected or abandoned for the next 19 years. In 1925, part of the plot (near the corner of Montgall and Rochester) was deeded to city of Kansas City for use as a neighborhood playground. Opened in a 1 August 1925 ceremony, the park offered "Pet Night", in which children won prizes for displaying the largest, smallest, and the most deformed dog. Another day saw swimsuits awarded to boys who created wood carvings from dead trees.

Second park
The second Kansas City Electric Park, this time at 46th Street and the Paseo, opened 19 May 1907. Like the first one, it was a trolley park (this time served by the Troost Avenue, Woodland Avenue, and Rockhill lines of the Metropolitan Street Railway Company), but the successor was one of the largest (if not the largest) ever to be called Electric Park.  It had "band concerts, vaudeville, Electric Fountain, ballroom, natatorium, German village, alligator farm, chutes, Dips Coaster, Norton slide, penny parlors, novelty stand, Japanese rolling ball, scenic railway, pool room, a Hale's Tour of the World, Electric Studio, boat tours, old mill, a Temple of Mirth, Flying Lady, Double Whirl, Circle Swing, soda fountain and ice cream shops, knife rack, doll rack, shooting gallery, air gun gallery, giant teeter, boating, outdoor swimming, carousel, clubhouse cafe, Casino 5 cent theater, fortune telling and palmistry, covered promenade and horseless buggy garage." Souvenirs from the park touted it as "Kansas City's Coney Island," which it matched by having 100,000 light bulbs adorn its buildings.

In 1911, the second Kansas City park attracted one million people, averaging 8000 paying customers per day that season.

Much of the second Electric Park in Kansas City burned to the ground in 1925. The fire was witnessed by a young Walter Cronkite, who later wrote

Despite the devastating blaze, the park maintained its operating hours as its theater and its aquarium remained open for the remainder of its last year. In the final days of 1925, Electric Park inaugurated its Coin Carnival to replace its destroyed midway. The two weeks before its final closing, Electric Park celebrated its own Mardi Gras after the Heim family decided to sell the land. On 1 September 1925, a fireworks exhibition punctuated the park's last closing ceremony.

Walt Disney and the Kansas City Electric Park
After Elias Disney moved his family to Kansas City in 1911, a nine-year-old Walt and his younger sister Ruth became regular visitors to the second Electric Park, which was a mere 15 blocks from their new home at 3028 Bellefontaine Street. While the Kansas City park was inspired by the original White City in the 1893 Columbian Exposition (for which Elias was a construction worker), Walt later took many features of the Kansas City Electric Park (including a train whose track ringed the park grounds and the daily fireworks at closing time) and incorporated them into Disneyland when he started developing the plans for the layout of the park that he opened in 1955.

Unlike many of its contemporaries, the Electric Park's grounds were meticulously maintained with landscaping designed to accentuate the park's rides and other attractions, a trait that Disney insisted to be maintained in Disneyland. Electric Park's "Living Statuary"'s electric procession featured young women emerging from a fountain onto a platform while bathed in various colored lights. Disney's entrances featured structures similar in design and structure to that of Electric Park's Monkey Cage Gazebo. In fact, most of the attractions that graced Disney's childhood park had similar counterparts in the California park that he opened three decades later.

See also 
Electric Park
Trolley park
Luna Park
Walt Disney
White City

References

External links

Defunct amusement parks in the United States
Buildings and structures in Kansas City, Missouri
Amusement parks in Missouri
1907 establishments in Missouri
1925 disestablishments in Missouri